Raji is a small Sino-Tibetan language of Nepal and Uttarakhand, India. Speakers were until recently nomadic.

Distribution
Raji is spoken in the following areas of southwestern Nepal:

Lumbini Province: Banke and Bardiya districts
Karnali Province: Surkhet
Sudurpashchim Province: Kailali and Kanchanpur districts

It is also spoken by Raji people of Uttarakhand, India, primarily living in Pithoragarh district.

In Pithoragarh district, Rastogi (2015) reports that Raji is spoken in the hamlets of Kimkhola, Bhogtirua, Ganagaon, Chipaltara, Madanbori, Kutachaurani, Altodi, Jamtadi, Khirdwari and Chakarpur.

Dialects
Khatri (2008) divides Raji into 3 main regional dialects, for which he also provides word lists.
Barabandale: spoken in Jyotinagar, Katasi, Lalbojhi, Kuti, Bhuruwa, Solta, Khairehi, and Keodi of Kailali District; Sundarpur, Bandevi Sibir, Daiji, krishanpur and Chela Sibir of Kanchanpur District; and Rajigaun, Galfa, and Babiyachaur of Surkhet District.
Purbiya: Shankarpur, Machhagadh, Baniyabhar, Rambhapur, Dhakela, Dhadhawar, Sanoshree, Gulariya Municipality and Phanphena of Bardiya District.Also Speak in Chhinchu of Surkhet District.
Naukule : Spoken in Jhil and Kuchaini of Chaumala, Shankarpur of Masuriya, Jarahi of Sadepani, Dhangaghi Municipality and Manera. All are located within Kailali District.

References

Raji–Raute languages
Languages of Nepal
Languages of Uttarakhand
Endangered languages of India
Languages of Lumbini Province
Languages of Karnali Province